Lugi HF is a handball team from Lund, Sweden. Both the men's and women's teams play in the top division in 2021–22, Handbollsligan and Svensk handbollselit respectively.

Sports Hall information

Name: – Sparbanken Skåne Arena
City: – Lund
Capacity: – 3000
Address: – Arenatorget 2–6, 222 28 Lund

Men's team

Lugi's men's team were promoted to the top division, at the time known as Allsvenskan, in 1959. In their debut season in the top-flight, Lugi finished second in the league behind IK Heim, making them Swedish Championship (SM) silver medalists. They finished third in both 1960–61 and 1961–62, before being relegated in 1962–63. They were promoted back in 1964, but were relegated after one season. Lugi were promoted to Allsvenskan again in 1971 and have since played every season in the top level except 1992–93. By this time a playoffs had been introduced to determine the champions. In 1978, Lugi reached the finals but were defeated by HK Drott. Two years later, they won their only SM gold so far, winning the final series against Ystads IF. In the following season, they reached the semifinals of the European Cup, where they lost against East German club SC Magdeburg. Lugi qualified for the SM finals again in 1984, but were defeated by HK Drott. In 1984–85, they reached to the semifinals of the Cup Winners' Cup, where they were eliminated by Soviet club CSKA Moskva. A year later they reached the semifinals in the IHF Cup. They lost against Spanish club CB Tecnisa. In 1996, Lugi lost the SM finals against Redbergslids IK. In 2012–13, Lugi won the regular season, but were eliminated by HK Drott in the semifinals. A year later, they reached the final, only to lose against Alingsås HK.

Kits and Players

Current squad 
Squad for the 2022-23 season

Goalkeepers
 12  Victor Hedberg
 16  Kasper Hall
Wingers
LW
 22  Axel Andersson
 33  Oliver Olsson
RW
 6  Christopher Schnell
 17  Adam Wennerholm
 27  Måns Simonsson
Line Players
 2  Albin Carlsson
 4  Jacob Söderberg
 8  Mads  Kragh Thomsen

Back Players
LB
 13  Adrian Hesslekrans
 15  Axel Janhall
 24  Fredrik Olsson
 26  Rasmus Nilsson
 28  Jonas Elverhøy
CB
 7  Axel Månsson
 14  Casper Käll
RB
 20  Assar Kammenhed
 21  Theo Übelacker

Transfers
Transfers for the 2023-24 season

Joining

Leaving
  Casper Käll (CB) (to  Fenix Toulouse Handball)
  Fredrik Olsson (LB) (to  Skanderborg Aarhus Håndbold)

Women's team 
The women's team advanced to national league in 2006 and have been playing there since. Two years 2012 and 2013 they have reached the final in championship but both times they lost to IK Sävehof in the final. 2011 Lugi played in Cupwinners  Cup and reached semifinal.https://www.aftonbladet.se/sportbladet/handboll/article12754719.ab

Kits and players

European record

Current squad 
Squad for the 2022-23 season

Goalkeepers
 1  Victoria Solli Berg
 12  Hanna Popaja
 16  Tuva Dahlqvist
Wingers
LW
 22  Lova Nyrell
 23  Amanda Andersson
 24  Alva Hopstadius
 30  Clara Lerby
RW
   Tania Knudsen
 4  Filippa Hall
 5  Emma Ekenman-Fernis
 27  Wilma Svensson
Line Players
 6  Filippa Nyman
 10  Malva Carlsson
 11  Ofelia Shoai Hallberg
 28  Perla Rainey-Malmberg

Back Players
LB
 2  Cecilie Bjerre
 3  Sabina Jacobsen
 8  Cornelia Dahlström 
 18  Elise Lönnegren
 25  Lovisa Liljenberg
CB
   Asdis Augustdottir
 9  Agnes Lundin
 20  Isabelle Gulldén
 21  Nora Möller Adébo
RB
 7  Kajsa Lindeberg
 19  Amanda Iséni
  Sofia Delac

Transfers
Transfers for the 2023-24 season

Joining

Leaving

References

External links
 
 

Swedish handball clubs
Sport in Lund
Handball clubs established in 1941
1941 establishments in Sweden
Sport in the Øresund Region